Legislative elections were held in the Eastern Region of Nigeria on 16 November 1961.

Results

References

The Europa World Year Book 1965, Volume II, p. 864

Regional elections in Nigeria
Eastern Region
1961 in Nigeria